Petersburg High School is located in Petersburg, Virginia, and is the only high school in Petersburg City Public Schools.

Petersburg High School is located on Johnson Road in Petersburg, Virginia. The new school combined the old Petersburg High School on Washington Street (currently the Appomattox Regional Governor's School) and the old Peabody High School (currently Peabody Middle School) on Wesley Street.

Petersburg High School opened the current Johnson Road location on September 3, 1974.  The campus style architecture of the facility was divided into four wings by architect Gordon B. Galusha.  The William W. Lawson, Jr. Gymnasium, which extends east of the main building, was named after the title winning basketball coach, the late William H. Lawson, Jr.  It has one full-sized basketball court and seats approximately 3,000 fans comfortably.  The auditorium is located in the main building and seats 924 with 532 plush red-cushioned seats located in the orchestra.  Seating in the rear of the auditorium includes desk-top seats.  The band and choral rooms include built in risers and an individual sound studio for instrumental music students. The cafeteria, adjacent to the auditorium, is centrally located to provide easy access by all wings.

Notable alumni
Tyra Bolling - R&B Artist
Ricky Hunley - (1980) retired NFL player
Byron E. Johnson - (1984) retired NFL player
Kendall Langford - (2003) NFL player
Moses Malone - (1974) retired NBA player 
Frank Mason - (2012) Current NBA player
Jerome Mathis - (2001) NFL/AFL player 
Trey Songz - (2002) R&B Artist 
Quinton Spain - (2011) Current NFL player 
Blair Underwood - (1982) actor 
Mark West - retired NBA player 
Avis Wyatt - Professional Euro-League Basketball player
Terrance Whittle, College Baseball coach

References

Public high schools in Virginia
Schools in Petersburg, Virginia
Buildings and structures in Petersburg, Virginia
1974 establishments in Virginia
Educational institutions established in 1974